Badikedar is a Gaupalika(Nepali: गाउपालिका ; gaupalika) in Doti District in the Sudurpashchim Province of far-western Nepal. Badikedar has a population of 16720.The land area is 332.55 km2. It was formed by merging Ghangal, Mannakapadi and Lanakedareshwor VDCs.

Demographics
At the time of the 2011 Nepal census, Badikedar Rural Municipality had a population of 16,731. Of these, 67.2% spoke Doteli, 28.1% Nepali, 3.6% Magar, 0.8% Kham and 0.3% other languages as their first language.

In terms of ethnicity/caste, 46.2% were Chhetri, 18.8% Magar, 9.1% Kami, 8.8% Thakuri, 8.0% Sarki, 4.5% Hill Brahmin, 1.5% Damai/Dholi, 1.0% Badi, 0.9% Tamang, 0.7% Sanyasi/Dasnami, 0.4% Gurung, 0.1% other Dalit and 0.2% others.

In terms of religion, 96.3% were Hindu, 3.6% Buddhist and 0.1% Christian.

References

Rural municipalities in Doti District
Rural municipalities of Nepal established in 2017